Russia has the largest number of small nuclear reactors in the world.

'*' Once built, ELENA will be the smallest commercial nuclear reactor ever built.

See also 
 Small modular reactor
 Micro nuclear reactor
 List of nuclear reactors
 List of small nuclear reactor designs
 List of United States Naval reactors
 List of Soviet Naval reactors

References

External links 
 List of Small Nuclear Reactors
 Publications on Small Nuclear Reactors
 Small Nuclear Power Reactors
 The encyclopedia of Earth - Small nuclear power reactors
 Nuclear Regulatory Commission´s advanced reactors
 World's Smallest Nuclear Reactors

Nuclear reactors